iQFoil is a windsurfing class selected by World Sailing to replace the RS:X for the 2024 Summer Olympics. The discipline has similarities to Formula Windsurfing, however a notable difference is that sailors only use one sail. The sail size is 9m2 for the men and 8m2 for the women. The rider has a choice between using a hydrofoil or a conventional 68 cm fin.

See also
 iQFoil World Championships
 Windfoiling

References

External links
 iQFOiL - 2024 Olympic Windsurfing Class 
 iQFOiL Class - Official Site
 ISAF iQFOiL Microsite
 Starboard official website

Classes of World Sailing
Windsurfing boards
Olympic sailing classes
Hydrofoils